Sarku Sara (also Romanized as Sarkū Sarā; also known as Sūrgūsarā) is a small village in Chehel Shahid Rural District, in the Central District of Ramsar County, Mazandaran Province, Iran. At the 2006 census, its population was 61, in 15 families.

References 

Populated places in Ramsar County